Cacia tonkinensis is a species of beetle in the family Cerambycidae. It was described by Maurice Pic in 1926. It is known from Vietnam.

References

Cacia (beetle)
Beetles described in 1926